Xeuilley is a commune in the Meurthe-et-Moselle department in north-eastern France.

Jacques Callot's family owned property in Xeuilley, and he depicted it in some of his work.

Population

Geography
The Madon forms most of the commune's eastern border.

See also
 Communes of the Meurthe-et-Moselle department

References

Communes of Meurthe-et-Moselle
Three Bishoprics